Foale is a surname. Notable people with the surname include: 

Marion Foale (born 1939), English artist and fashion designer
Foale and Tuffin, an English fashion design business
Michael Foale (born 1957), British-American astrophysicist and astronaut